"Imagine That" is a song by LL Cool J released as the lead single from his eighth album, G.O.A.T. It was released on June 27, 2000 for Def Jam Recordings, produced by Rockwilder and LL Cool J, and featured a guest appearance by female rapper LeShaun.

The single was the most successful of the three total tracks released from the album, peaking at number 98 on the Billboard Hot 100, #16 on the Hot Rap Singles and #46 on the Hot R&B/Hip-Hop Songs. The music video for the single was directed by Hype Williams.

Track listing

A-side
 "Imagine That" (Radio Edit) – 4:07
 "Imagine That" (LP Version) – 4:06
 "Imagine That" (Instrumental) – 4:07

B-side
 "LL Cool J" (Radio Edit) – 4:10
 "LL Cool J" (LP Version) – 4:10
 "LL Cool J" (Instrumental) – 4:10

2000 singles
2000 songs
LL Cool J songs
Def Jam Recordings singles
Dirty rap songs
Music videos directed by Hype Williams
Song recordings produced by Rockwilder
Songs written by LL Cool J